The Seahawks Gdynia are an American football team based in Gdynia, Poland. They  play in the Liga Futbolu Amerykańskiego.

History 
The team was founded in October 2005 as the Pomorze Seahawks. In 2006 the Seahawks was one of four founders of the Polish American Football League and in the first season made their first appearance in the national championship game, the Polish Bowl, in 2006, but lost the game to the Warsaw Eagles. In 2008 they lost the Polish Bowl again to the Eagles. In 2009 the team makes his first appearance at the EFAF Challenge Cup.

First two seasons Seahawks played home games in Sopot, next three played in Gdańsk at the GOKF stadium. Since 2011 PLFA season Sehawks moved to Gdynia, changed name to the Seahawks Gdynia and played at the National Rugby Stadium.

After the 2017 season, the Seahawks left the Polish American Football League and joined the new Liga Futbolu Amerykańskiego.

Season-by-season records

Honours
 Polish Bowl
 Champions: 2012, 2014, 2015
 CEFL
 2nd place: 2018

See also 
 American football
 Sports in Tricity (Gdańsk, Gdynia, Sopot)

References

External links 
 

American football teams in Poland
Sport in Gdańsk
Sport in Gdynia
Sport in Sopot
American football teams established in 2005
2005 establishments in Poland